László Demény (born 6 October 1953) is a Hungarian fencer. He competed in the individual and team foil events at the 1980 Summer Olympics.

References

External links
 

1953 births
Living people
Hungarian male foil fencers
Olympic fencers of Hungary
Fencers at the 1980 Summer Olympics
Fencers from Budapest